Rákosmenti Községi Sport Kör is a professional football club based in Rákosmente, Budapest, Hungary, that competes in the Nemzeti Bajnokság III, the third tier of Hungarian football.

Name changes
1947–48: Rákoskerti MaDISz
1948–50: Rákoskerti SzIT
1950–51: Rákoskerti DISz
1951: dissolved
1956: refounded
1956–?: Rákoskerti SK

Honours
Nemzeti Bajnokság III:
Fourth: 2014-15

Managers
 György Véber 2015-16
 György Véber 2020-present

External links
 Profile on Magyar Futball

References

Football clubs in Hungary
Association football clubs established in 1949
1949 establishments in Hungary